Jayson Potroz (born 26 November 1991) is a New Zealand rugby union player. He plays at fullback in the Mitre 10 Cup for Taranaki. He also plays for the New England Free Jacks in Major League Rugby (MLR).

Potroz has played premier club rugby in Taranaki since he left Francis Douglas Memorial College in 2009, first playing for Stratford until 2013 and now Tukapa. He has played age group, development, representative sevens and featured in Taranaki pre-season matches for a number of years. However, he made his first-class debut in 2018 against Poverty Bay in a Ranfurly Shield pre-season match in Tikorangi, then against Wanganui in the second Ranfurly Shield pre-season match and came off the bench against Canterbury. He was best known in his first season for scoring a 55m intercept try in his third match of 2018 and scored three tries that year.

In 2019, Potroz started in all 10 matches for Taranaki scoring a total of 17 points, he played nine matches at fullback and one on the wing. At the end of the season, Potroz was named Back of the Year, the first non-Super Rugby player to win such an award. He also won Sevens Player of the Year.

In the Taranaki premier competition, Potroz predominantly plays five-five eighth for club Tukapa and currently sits on 99 games for the club as of 14 June 2020. In the 2017 club competition, Potroz was the leading try scorer and highest points scorer.

References

 Rugby History
 Taranaki Rugby profiles
 

1991 births
Living people
New Zealand rugby union players
Rugby union fly-halves
Rugby union centres
Rugby union wings
Rugby union fullbacks
Taranaki rugby union players
People educated at Francis Douglas Memorial College
New England Free Jacks players